The DSB class ME are a series of diesel-electric locomotives, introduced in 1981. A total of 37 units were built, all by the German factory Henschel for the Danish State Railways (DSB). They were among the first  AC drive locomotives in serial production. As of 2017, 33 units are still in service. Starting from 2020, the DSB began receiving new Vectron locomotives, the sale of Class Me began, and as of November 2021, 9 units have been sold.

History 
The locomotives were designed to haul heavier regional services in Sjælland, Denmark, in the early 1980s, replacing much of the old rolling stock in use at the time. 

The first unit, 1501 arrived in 1981 after many years of delay. Three years later, in 1983, DSB had received a total of 30 units. Although there had been some serious trouble with the locomotives, DSB found a solution on the problems, and an additional seven units were delivered in 1985.

As of 2017, 33 units are still in service, three have been scrapped and one is preserved at the Danish Railway Museum. The ME locomotives was expected to be replaced by IC3 train sets when the IC4 train sets were ready to take over Intercity services. The IC4 train set are very unstable in service and have a variety of problems, however, so they are not going to replace the IC3 train sets in Intercity services. As a result of this DSB have ordered 26 new electric locomotives that are going to replace the ME locomotives by 2020.
The units were originally painted in DSB's black/red livery, but in 2006 they were all painted dark blue with red details on the side. In October 2016, DSB began painting the locomotives red to match their new logo.

The exhaust stack is below the air intake of the Bombardier double-decker coaches used in regional services. The air in the coaches was found to have a high concentration of diesel particulate matter, which induces cancer. DSB changed the air filters in 2013, providing a DPM reduction of 40%. But the concentration could still induce cancer for train staff, because they spend a long time in the coaches.

December the 11th 2021, marks the Class Me’s last day of service in DSB, as it marks the last day of the current service schedule. The 12th a new schedule will enter service. In the new schedule, the local services run by ME locomotives, will be fully replaced by the new DSB Class EB Vectron and the DSB Class MG IC4 (København - Kalundborg) The rest of the Class Me will join the already 9 sold, in a new life in Sweden at Nordic Re-Finance AB as Class TME. They will be upgraded with the new ETCS signal system, and can therefore also run in Denmark as well as Sweden and Norway. Few units will keep the current Danish ATC, and two units will still be in Denmark for the queen, as the line from Fredericia to Aarhus is yet to be electrified.

See also 
 NSB Di 4

Sources

External links 
 

ME
Co′Co′ locomotives
Henschel locomotives
Railway locomotives introduced in 1981
Diesel-electric locomotives of Denmark
Standard gauge locomotives of Denmark
Passenger locomotives